Hammer DeRoburt  (25 September 1922 – 15 July 1992) was the first President of the Republic of Nauru, and ruled the country for most of its first twenty years of independence.

Background and early career
DeRoburt was born in Nauru on 25 September 1922. He was the son of DeRoburt and Eidumunang; his maternal grandfather Daimon was the island's head chief from 1920 to 1930. He also had Banaban heritage, as his grandmother was from the island. He was raised in Boe District. After being educated on Nauru, he attended the Gordon Institute of Technology in Geelong, Australia. After returning to Nauru, he started working as a teacher.

During the Japanese occupation of Nauru he was deported to Truk by the Japanese, along with most of the Nauruan population. When he returned to Nauru in 1946 he started working at the Department of Education. He decided to stand in the first elections to the Local Government Council in 1951, and although he gained enough support to be nominated as a candidate in the Boe constituency, he was disqualified due to irregularities in his nomination. Local residents and European residents protested without success, whilst a petition to the 1953 Visiting Mission from the United Nations was also overlooked.

In 1955 elections he stood again in the Boe constituency and was elected to the Council. In 1956, the Council elected him the last Head Chief of Nauru.

Presidency of post-independence Nauru

DeRoburt led the country to independence on 31 January 1968 and was president for most of the period until 17 August 1989. In December 1976, younger politicians gained a majority and installed Bernard Dowiyogo as president, but DeRoburt returned to power in May 1978. He was also out of office for two short periods in September and December 1986.

In his final term, DeRoburt's government filed a case against Australia in the International Court of Justice for not rehabilitating mined-out areas of the island.  His last public appearance was in the ICJ hearing in November 1991.

Personal

He was given an honorary knighthood by Queen Elizabeth II in 1982.

DeRoburt is credited with popularising Australian rules football to Nauru, which became the national sport.

He died in Melbourne in 1992 from diabetes mellitus.

References

1922 births
People from Boe District
Nauruan educators
People deported from Nauru
Nauruan civil servants
Head Chiefs of Nauru
Members of the Parliament of Nauru
Presidents of Nauru
Honorary Knights Grand Cross of the Order of St Michael and St George
Officers of the Order of the British Empire
1992 deaths
20th-century Nauruan politicians